John Michael Turturro (born February 28, 1957) is an American actor and filmmaker. He is known for his varied complex roles in independent films. He has appeared in over sixty feature films and has worked frequently with the Coen brothers, Adam Sandler, and Spike Lee. He has received a Primetime Emmy Award and nominations for four Screen Actors Guild Awards, and three Golden Globe Awards.

He received his career breakthrough with Five Corners (1987). He acted in Spike Lee's Do the Right Thing (1989), Mo Better Blues (1990), Jungle Fever (1991), and Clockers (1995). He also starred in Coens' Miller's Crossing (1990), Barton Fink (1991), for which he won the Cannes Film Festival Award for Best Actor, The Big Lebowski (1998), and O Brother, Where Art Thou? (2000). He also starred in Fearless (1993), Quiz Show (1994), and Gloria Bell (2018). He portrayed Seymour Simmons in the Transformers film series (2007–2017) and Carmine Falcone in The Batman (2022).

For his role in the USA Network series Monk he received the Primetime Emmy Award for Outstanding Guest Actor in a Comedy Series. He starred in the HBO miniseries The Night Of (2016) earning a Primetime Emmy Award for Outstanding Lead Actor in a Limited or Anthology Series or Movie nomination. He had a recurring role in the Showtime series The Plot Against America (2020), and he currently stars in the Apple TV+ series Severance (2022–present), for which he was nominated for a Primetime Emmy Award for Outstanding Supporting Actor in a Drama Series and a Golden Globe Award for Best Supporting Actor - Television Series.

He's directed five films, Mac (1992), Illuminata (1998), Romance and Cigarettes (2005), Fading Gigolo (2013), and The Jesus Rolls (2020).

Early life
John Turturro was born on February 28, 1957, in the Brooklyn borough of New York City, New York, the son of Katherine Florence (Incerella) and Nicholas Turturro. His mother was born in the U.S. to Italian parents with roots in Sicily, and was an amateur jazz singer who had worked in a naval yard during World War II. His maternal grandmother died of a botched home abortion when his mother was six, leaving his mother in an orphanage, as his grandfather was unable to provide for the children on his own. His father had emigrated at age six from Giovinazzo, Italy to the United States, and later worked as a carpenter and construction worker before joining the U.S. Navy.

Turturro was raised a Roman Catholic and moved to the Rosedale section of Queens, New York, with his family when he was 6. He majored in theatre arts at the State University of New York at New Paltz and completed his MFA at the Yale School of Drama.

Career
Turturro's first film appearance was a non-speaking extra role in Martin Scorsese's critically acclaimed Raging Bull (1980). He created the title role of John Patrick Shanley's Danny and the Deep Blue Sea at the Playwrights Conference at the Eugene O'Neill Theatre Center in 1983. He repeated it the following year Off-Broadway and won an Obie Award. Turturro had a notable supporting role in William Friedkin's action film To Live and Die in L.A. (1985), as the henchman of the villainous counterfeiter played by Willem Dafoe.

Spike Lee liked Turturro's performance in Five Corners (1987) so much that he cast him in Do the Right Thing (1989). This movie was the first of a long-standing collaboration between the director and Turturro, which includes work together on a total of nine filmsmore than any other actor in the Lee oeuvreincluding  Mo' Better Blues (1990), Jungle Fever (1991), Clockers (1995), Girl 6 (1996), He Got Game (1998), Summer of Sam (1999), She Hate Me (2004), and Miracle at St. Anna (2008).

Turturro has appeared in both comedy and drama films, and engaged in an extended collaboration with the Coen Brothershe appeared in their films Miller's Crossing (1990), Barton Fink (1991, in the lead role), The Big Lebowski (1998), and O Brother, Where Art Thou? (2000). Turturro has also appeared in several of Adam Sandler's movies, such as Mr. Deeds (2002) and You Don't Mess with the Zohan (2008). He played a severely disturbed patient of Jack Nicholson's character in the comedy Anger Management and played Johnny Depp's character's antagonist in Secret Window.

Turturro hosted Saturday Night Live in 1994, where he spoofed his then-recently made film, Quiz Show, being told he was ineligible to host unless he answered questions in a booth and if he failed, the honor of hosting would go to Joey Buttafuoco, who was actually backstage to witness Turturro's test. He won an Emmy award for his portrayal of Adrian Monk's brother Ambrose in the USA Network series Monk, and reprised the role on numerous occasions. He has also been nominated and won many awards from film organizations such as Screen Actors Guild, Cannes Film Festival, Golden Globes and others.

Turturro produced and directed, as well as acted in, the film Illuminata (1999), which also starred his wife, actress Katherine Borowitz. He wrote and directed the film Romance and Cigarettes (2005). In 2006 he appeared in Robert De Niro's The Good Shepherd, and as the Sector 7 agent Seymour Simmons in four films of the Transformers live-action series. In 2010, he directed (and had cameo on-screen appearances in) Passione, which chronicles the rich musical heritage of Naples, Italy.

His stage directorial debut was in October 2011, with the Broadway play Relatively Speaking, in which he guided an ensemble of  veteran actors in a production of three comedic one-act plays, written by Elaine May, Woody Allen and Ethan Coen. The cast included Julie Kavner, Marlo Thomas,  Mark Linn-Baker and Steve Guttenberg.

Turturro's fifth directorial film Fading Gigolo premiered at the Toronto International Film Festival (TIFF) in mid-September 2013. Turturro also acts in the film alongside Woody Allen, who plays a novice pimp overseeing the sex work of Turturro's character. During a September 2013 interview, Turturro expressed his intention to draw parallels between sex work and acting, explaining that the latter is a "service business" in which actors are "acting out people's wishes or fantasies". In March 2014, Turturro received the Career Achievement tribute and award at the 31st Edition of the Miami International Film Festival at the Olympia Theater in Downtown Miami. Turturro starred in the 2016 miniseries The Night Of, garnering a Primetime Emmy Award nomination. In 2019 Turturro played William of Baskerville in a television adaptation of Umberto Eco's The Name of the Rose.

In 2022, he appeared in Matt Reeves' film The Batman based on the DC Comics character of the same name as Carmine Falcone.

Personal life
Turturro's brother is actor Nicholas Turturro. Composer and film director Richard Termini and actress Aida Turturro are his cousins. He has two children with his wife, actress Katherine Borowitz, who moved on to a social work career in 2016.

John Turturro participates as a member of the Jury for the New York International Children's Film Festival (NYICFF), which is dedicated to screening films for children between the ages of 3 and 18.  Turturro holds dual Italian and American citizenship as of January 2011.

He has lived in Park Slope in Brooklyn, New York since 1988.

Filmography

Film

Television

Video games

Audiobooks

Theatre

Awards and nominations

References

External links
 
 
 
 

1957 births
Living people
American people of Italian descent
People of Sicilian descent
American male film actors
American male screenwriters
American male stage actors
American male television actors
American male voice actors
American writers of Italian descent
Cannes Film Festival Award for Best Actor winners
Citizens of Italy through descent
David di Donatello winners
Directors of Caméra d'Or winners
Film directors from New York City
Male actors from New York City
Obie Award recipients
People from Park Slope
People from Rosedale, Queens
People of Apulian descent
Primetime Emmy Award winners
Screenwriters from New York (state)
State University of New York at New Paltz alumni
Yale School of Drama alumni
20th-century American male actors
21st-century American male actors